Kevin Frew (born February 12, 1982) is a lacrosse player who plays for the Washington Bayhawks of Major League Lacrosse.

Professional career 
2007 (Washington): Played in eleven out of twelve regular season games as a midfielder picking up 48 ground balls on the season.

2006 (Baltimore): Played in eleven regular season games for the Bayhawks recording 46 ground balls on the year. Scored his first career goal against Philadelphia while leading the Bayhawks in face-off wins with 127.

2004 (Boston): Played in three games for the Boston Cannons picking up 15 ground balls on the season.

College career 
Played his college lacrosse at the University of North Carolina, ending his career as the school's career leader in ground balls per game and face-offs won as well as leading the nation in these categories. Selected to the 2004 All-ACC tournament team and received honorable-mention All-America status. Was named the UNC team MVP as a senior.

Personal 
Currently works as a broker for Kelly & Associates Insurance Group. His hobbies include fishing and golf. He has two brothers, younger brother Doug played lacrosse and the University of Mary Washington. He recently married his girlfriend of ten years, Tracy.

Statistics

MLL

External links
 Washington Bayhawks Player Bio 
 UNC Player Bio

References

American lacrosse players
Major League Lacrosse players
Living people
1982 births
North Carolina Tar Heels men's lacrosse players
Chesapeake Bayhawks players
Mary Washington Eagles